Joe Patton (December 30, 1952) was a Republican member of the Kansas House of Representatives, representing the 54th district.  He served from 2007 until 2013.

He is also a current lawyer for the Patton&Patton law firm in Topeka and Lenexa, Kansas.

References

External links
 Project Vote Smart profile

Republican Party members of the Kansas House of Representatives
Living people
21st-century American politicians
1952 births
Washburn University alumni